is a Japanese football player currently playing for Hokkaido Consadole Sapporo.

Club team career statistics
Updated to 18 February 2019.

References

External links
Profile at Consadole Sapporo

1985 births
Living people
Shizuoka University alumni
Association football people from Nara Prefecture
Japanese footballers
J1 League players
J2 League players
Japan Football League players
Honda FC players
Sagan Tosu players
Hokkaido Consadole Sapporo players
Association football midfielders